The Roman Catholic Diocese of Jiading (or Leshan)  is a diocese located in the city of Leshan (formerly Jiading Prefecture) in the Ecclesiastical province of Chongqing in China.

History

 July 10, 1929: Established as Apostolic Prefecture of Yazhou (Ya-tcheou-fou; 雅州) from the Apostolic Vicariate of Suifu (Su-tcheou-fou; 敘府)
 March 3, 1933: Promoted as Apostolic Vicariate of Yazhou 雅州
 February 9, 1938: Renamed as Apostolic Vicariate of Jiading (Kia-tin-fou; 嘉定)
 April 11, 1946: Promoted as Diocese of Jiading 嘉定

See also
 Anglican Diocese of Szechwan
 Catholic Church in Sichuan

References
 GCatholic.org
 Catholic Hierarchy

Jiading
Christian organizations established in 1929
Roman Catholic dioceses and prelatures established in the 20th century